The 2019–20 Championnat National A is the 65th season of the Championnat National A, the highest basketball league in Tunisia. The season started 28 September 2019 and ended 8 August 2020. The winners will qualify for the 2021 BAL season.

On 14 March 2020 the season was postponed due to the COVID-19 pandemic. On 9 May, it was announced the league was to resume behind closed doors on 15 July.

Eventually, US Monastir won its second-straight title.

Teams
This season, 12 teams played in the league. CA Bizertin and Stade Gabèsien were promoted from the Nationale B.

First stage

Group A

Group B

Super 6

Playoffs

Bracket

Semifinals

|}

Finals

|}

References

Tunisian Division I Basketball League

Tunisia